Robert Brewer may refer to:

 Robert Brewer (figure skater) (born 1939), American figure skater
 Robert Brewer (American football), American football player
 Robert B. Brewer (1924–1996), U.S. Army officer 
 Robert S. Brewer Jr. (born 1946), American attorney